Anupam Garg is a professor in the department of Physics & Astronomy at Northwestern University, Illinois. He received his Ph.D. in 1983 from Cornell University. In 2012, he became a Fellow of the American Physical Society (APS) thanks to his work on molecular magnetism and macroscopic quantum phenomena.

Garg is best known for formulating the Leggett–Garg inequality, named for Anthony James Leggett and himself, which is a mathematical inequality fulfilled by all macrorealistic physical theories. He is also known for the Garg-Onuchic-Ambegaokar model of charge transfer. His current research interests center around quantum and semi-classical phenomena associated with the orientation of quantum mechanical spin.

Garg is the author of a graduate physics textbook, Classical Electromagnetism in a Nutshell.

References

Cornell University alumni
21st-century American physicists
Northwestern University faculty
Living people
Year of birth missing (living people)
Place of birth missing (living people)
IIT Delhi alumni
Fellows of the American Physical Society